Rebeca is a 2003 Spanish-language telenovela produced by Venevisión International. The telenovela was written by Alberto Gómez and stars Mariana Seoane and Ricardo Álamo as the main protagonists with Gaby Espino portraying the main antagonist.

Plot
Rebeca Linares (Mariana Seoane) is a young, hard-working woman who lives in Miami with Matilde, her mother and her two sisters, Niurka and Patty. In order to be able to support her family and her ailing mother, she has two jobs working at a food delivery shop at the local market and a cleaner at a car dealership. At night, she studies in order to achieve her dream of becoming a teacher.

One day while in a hurry to make a delivery, she has an accident where she crashes her delivery truck against the car of rich billionaire playboy Eduardo Montalban (Ricardo Álamo). It is through this chance encounter that a romance develops between them, although Eduardo is being pressured to marry his rich girlfriend Princesa (Gaby Espino), though he isn't serious about settling down.

But Rebeca will also meet Sergio, an older, rich and attractive man who will also fall in love with her. Little does she know that Sergio is Eduardo's father. From this point on, father and son will become enemies to fight for the love of one woman. Martin, Rebeca's neighbor and childhood friend, will also join this love triangle to fight for Rebeca's love, despite the fact that Rebeca only views him as a brother.

Princesa, overcome by jealousy that Eduardo left her for Rebeca, will join forces with Regina, Sergio's sister who is married to Adalberto, Rebeca's biological father who abandoned Matilde while she was pregnant, and Sara, the maid at the Montalban mansion who hides her own terrible secrets. For many years, Sara was secretly in love with Sergio, and they had a brief affair that led to the birth of Carolina (Maite Embil) who is not aware that the house keeper is her real mother. Also, Sara was responsible for the death of Sergio's wife.

Cast

References

External links

Rebeca at 
Rebeca Synopsis (Rebeca) at 

2003 telenovelas
Television shows set in Miami
Venevisión telenovelas
2003 American television series debuts
2003 American television series endings
2003 Venezuelan television series debuts
2003 Venezuelan television series endings
Spanish-language American telenovelas
Venezuelan telenovelas